Six in Paris is a 1965 French comedy-drama anthology film.

Cast and segments
"Saint-Germain-des-Prés" Directed by Jean Douchet
Jean-Pierre Andréani as Raymond
Jean-François Chappey as Jean
Barbara Wilkin as Katherine

Segment about an American girl student taken in by a French playboy and gets wise to another's ways. Director Douchet was at the time, like Eric Rohmer, a freshly resigned critic from Cahiers du Cinéma best known later for book on Hitchcock.

"Gare du Nord" Directed by Jean Rouch
Nadine Ballot as Odile
Gilles Quéant as Stranger
Barbet Schroeder as Jean-Pierre

Segment shows the influence of documentary and 16 mm by Rouch. Also notably uses almost one long hand-held continuous take, following Odile from a breakfast table argument with her boyfriend (played by producer/director Barbet Schroeder in an early role), whom she is bored and irritated by into the street where she meets a mysterious man. The man seems to be the answer to all her complaints and wants her to go away with him but for otherwise saying he will kill himself if she does not.

"Rue Saint-Denis" Directed by Jean-Daniel Pollet
Micheline Dax as Prostitute
Claude Melki as Leon

Format again inflects form in Jean Daniel Pollet's segment with comedy as real-world stage actress Michelline Dax plays the worldly Parisian prostitute broadly as she kindheartedly makes fun of her inexperienced customer. Melki, like a few New Wave actors, riffs on Buster Keaton in nod to a tradition of shorts being comedies in the role.

"Place de l'Etoile" Directed by Eric Rohmer
Marcel Gallon as Victim
Jean-Michel Rouzière as Jean-Marc
Georges Bez
Jean Douchet as A client
Sarah Georges-Picot	
Maya Josse as Woman in the metro
Philippe Sollers as A client

Some would later identify this as uncharacteristically Rohmer neglecting his writing on silent comedy. The short plays upon the confusion around the Arc de Triomphe in Paris embodied by the character Jean-Marc as deftly shot by Nestor Almendros. In going to and from work the character mistakenly believes that he has killed a man in a rude encounter and tries to dodge location and responsibility.

"Montparnasse-Levallois" Directed by Jean-Luc Godard
Serge Davri as Ivan
Philippe Hiquilly as Roger
Joanna Shimkus as Monica

Segment interprets the news story that Alfred Lubitsch (Jean-Paul Belmondo) reads to Angela (Anna Karina) in a restaurant in A Woman Is a Woman (1961). Itself based on the Jean Giraudoux story "La Méprise" with the genders reversed in the film where two women receive the letters mistakenly sent by their lover to the wrong person. Shot by American documentarian Albert Maysles, showing the woman's plight, Monica, to retrieve and amend the letters she sent.

"La Muette" Directed by Claude Chabrol
Stéphane Audran as The mother
Claude Chabrol as The father
Gilles Chusseau as Boy
Dany Saril as The maid

Known for his Hitchcockian 'horror-beneath-the-bourgeois-surface' exposed on film, director Claude Chabrol himself plays the 'bourgeois' father here with his then-wife Stephane Audran as the mother of a mischievous boy who starts putting ear-plugs in his ears to keep from hearing their constant arguments playfully exploiting the critical-laden term diegesis.

References

External links
 
 
 

1965 films
1965 comedy-drama films
1960s French-language films
Films about prostitution in Paris
Films directed by Claude Chabrol
Films directed by Éric Rohmer
Films directed by Jean-Luc Godard
Films directed by Jean Rouch
Films produced by Barbet Schroeder
French anthology films
French comedy-drama films
1960s French films